Upper Elk Lake and Lower Elk Lake, collectively known as the Elk Lakes, are a pair of alpine lakes in southeastern British Columbia, Canada. They sit in the valley formed between Mt Aosta to the south and Mount Fox to the north. The Elk Lakes sit approximately two miles from the border between the Provinces of British Columbia and Alberta

Upper Elk Lake is the headwaters of the Elk River.  The lakes and their immediate surroundings accordingly mark the northernmost portion of the Elk Valley and are protected as Elk Lakes Provincial Park.

The Elk Lakes cabin, maintained by the Alpine Club of Canada, is located a short distance east of Lower Elk Lake. There are also several nearby hiking trails and a tent-camping site near and around the lakes.

References

External links

Lakes of British Columbia
Kootenay Land District
Elk Valley (British Columbia)